The 1992 New Orleans Saints season was the franchise's 26th season in the National Football League, and the 17th with home games at the Superdome. This is also the last time the Saints qualified to the postseason until the 2000 season.

The 1992 Saints surrendered only 202 points during the season (12.6 points per game), the lowest total by any team in the 1990s. They also gave up the fewest passing yards (2,470) and second-fewest total yards (4,075) of any team in 1992. This was also only the second season where four linebackers from the same team made the pro bowl with the other time being the year prior.

Offseason
The team entered 1992 with great expectations after its NFC West division title season of 1991. It was the franchise's first division championship since entering the NFL in 1967. Most preseason forecasts had the Saints making the playoffs again and another division title possible.

NFL Draft

Personnel

Staff

Roster

Regular season
The team opened 1992 at Philadelphia, their first road opener in 11 years. The usually steely defense showed some chinks as Eagles running back Herschel Walker rushed for more than 100 yards. Turnovers caused by the two great defenses kept the game close, but the Eagles won 15–13. Offensive struggles continued the next week vs. Chicago, as the Bears led 6–0 at halftime. Big plays on both sides of the ball broke it open for the Saints, as quarterback Bobby Hebert connected with wide receivers Eric Martin and Wesley Carroll on touchdown passes of 52 and 72 yards, respectively. Two second half scores by the Saints' defense capped the 28–6 win – a fumble return by Robert "Pig" Goff and an interception return by Reggie Jones. Those plays set the tone for the defensive unit throughout 1992.

A 10–7 win over Atlanta followed and set up the annual battle with the San Francisco 49ers. The 49ers had worn the title of "Team of the Decade" for the 1980s and were the primary stumbling block for an otherwise resurgent Saints franchise during Jim Mora's tenure as head coach. The Sunday night, prime-time audience saw a tight contest throughout. With the Niners leading 16–10, the Saints faced first-and-goal at the San Francisco 2-yard line. Saints guard Derek Kennard was flagged for holding and, on the next play, a pass into tight coverage was picked off by 49ers cornerback Eric Davis. It was the Saints' sixth consecutive home game against the Niners decided by seven points or less.

The team rebounded with five straight wins and stood at 7–2 in the road game vs. the Niners.  For three quarters, the Saints dominated the clock and scoreboard, leading 20–7 on two touchdown passes by Hebert. But the defense couldn't hold the lead as Steve Young led San Francisco on two touchdown drives in the 4th quarter to win 21–20.

Most impressive of the Saints' 12 wins in 1992 came over the next three weeks, when the team won three home games in a 10-day span. The first was a Monday Night win over the Washington Redskins, 20–3, keyed by a Hebert-to-Early touchdown pass and stifling defense.

Another eventual playoff team came to the Superdome the following Sunday, as the Miami Dolphins took a 13–10 lead into the second half. A blindsiding takeaway from Dolphins quarterback Dan Marino by speed-rushing linebacker Pat Swilling led to Robert Goff's second fumble return touchdown of the season. Later, cornerback Vince Buck returned an interception for a score as the Dolphins were defeated, 24–13.

The third game in this trifecta was a Thursday night tilt against Atlanta. Despite several marches up and down the field – and a memorable rumble by fullback Craig "Ironhead" Heyward that left Falcons safety Scott Case staring up at the ring of lights high above the field –  the Saints offense managed just five field goals by late in the 4th quarter to lead 15–14. It was another defensive touchdown that saved the game for the Saints, this time an interception by Toi Cook. The Saints won two of their last three to finish 12–4, which was the second-best finish in team history.

Schedule

Standings

Postseason

NFC Wild Card Game

NFC: Philadelphia Eagles 36, New Orleans Saints 20

Despite the .750 winning percentage, the Saints couldn't catch the 14–2 Niners for the division crown. In the Wild Card Game, the Saints faced the Philadelphia Eagles in a rematch of their tough opening  game loss and an equally bruising game in 1991 won by the Saints. The Saints dictated the pace during the first half, leading 20–7 on a Heyward touchdown run and a Hebert-to-Early touchdown pass. Big plays on both sides of the ball turned game in the Eagles favor, the first being a Randall Cunningham-to-Fred Barnett touchdown pass and the last an interception return for a score by Eric Allen. The Eagles scored 26 points in the 4th quarter to win, 36–20. Until the 2018 NFC Championship Game, this was the last time the Saints lost a playoff game at home. They would lose two of their next three after that at home as well.

Awards and records
Statistically, the team finished with the top defense in the league in points allowed (202) and second-best in total yards allowed (254.6 per game) They were 5th in the NFL in the giveaway-takeaway ratio(+9)as the defense feasted on 20 fumbles and 18 interceptions. Of those 38 takeaways, six were returned for touchdowns. Sam Mills led the team in tackles with 130. Wayne Martin led the team in sacks, with 15.5. On offense, the team's passing game enjoyed its best season of the Jim Mora era to date. Hebert completed 59 percent of his passes for 3,287 yards and 19 touchdowns. Wide receiver Eric Martin had the third and final 1,000-yard season of his career.

Milestones

References

External links
Saints on Pro Football Reference
Saints on jt-sw.com

New Orleans
New Orleans Saints seasons
New